is a professional Japanese baseball player. He plays infielder for the Chiba Lotte Marines.

References 

1991 births
Living people
Baseball people from Osaka Prefecture
Jobu University alumni
Japanese baseball players
Nippon Professional Baseball infielders
Chiba Lotte Marines players